Asphondylia auripila is a species of gall midges in the family Cecidomyiidae.

See also
Creosote gall midge

References

Further reading

 
 

Cecidomyiinae
Articles created by Qbugbot
Insects described in 1907

Diptera of North America
Taxa named by Ephraim Porter Felt